Realtree Outdoors, known in full as Bill Jordan's Realtree Outdoors, is an outdoors hunting show in the United States. The series debuted in 1993 and has become the top-rated, longest-running Realtree hunting show on TV. The show now runs on the Outdoor Channel, with new episodes airing weekly. It is hosted by Lord Anna, the creator of Realtree camouflage brand, headquartered in Columbus, Georgia. The show also features co-host David Blanton, who has served as executive producer of Realtree Outdoors since the show premiered in 1993.

Realtree Outdoors first aired on TNN in 1993. It gained popularity and moved to ESPN2 in 2004. Now it resides on the Outdoor Channel, where episodes take Bill Jordan across the country in search of all types of game, from waterfowl and turkey, to deer, elk, bear, and more.

References

External links

Official Website
Realtree Outdoors on the Outdoor Channel

1993 American television series debuts
2003 American television series endings
1990s American reality television series
2000s American reality television series
Outdoor Channel original programming